St. Mary Catholic Secondary School is a Catholic high school located in the town of Cobourg, Ontario.

History

The school has been part of the Cobourg community for nearly 40 years. St. Mary Catholic Secondary School was founded in 1984 and moved to its current site in September 1998. The school’s current site was later expanded in 2005 with a new wing of twelve classrooms

Athletic and academic excellence

St Mary has a long history of athletic victories. Sports teams at St. Mary have won OFSAA titles in rowing, badminton, swimming, rugby, and javelin. It is also well known for its programming in arts and music.  Students from St Mary School are often recipients of important academic and athletic awards.

Notable alumni
Josh Richards, musician, influencer, actor and internet personality

Feeder schools
St Mary has a long line of feeder schools
St.  Joseph  Catholic  Elementary  School,  Cobourg
St.  Michael  Catholic  Elementary  School,  Cobourg
Notre  Dame  Catholic  Elementary  School,  Cobourg
St.  Anthony  Catholic  Elementary  School,  Port  Hope
St.  Mary  Catholic  Elementary  School,  Campbellford
St.  Mary  Catholic  Elementary  School,  Grafton

French immersion
St.  Mary  Catholic  Secondary  School is the Secondary  French  Immersion  Centre for all of Northumberland  County.

References

External links
St. Mary Catholic Secondary School

High schools in Northumberland County, Ontario
Catholic secondary schools in Ontario
Cobourg